Count Michael Goblet d'Alviella is a Belgian liberal politician, counsel-general, and mayor of Court-Saint-Étienne. He is a son of Jean Goblet d'Alviella and his wife, June Dierdre Corfield.  He is the grandson of Sir Conrad Laurence Corfield.

References

Year of birth missing (living people)
Living people
Michael
Mayors of places in Belgium
People from Court-Saint-Étienne